Ust-Shalashnaya is a rural locality (a settlement) in Dobryansky District, Perm Krai, Russia. The population was 30 as of 2010. There are 9 streets.

Geography 
Ust-Shalashnaya is located 53 km southeast of Dobryanka (the district's administrative centre) by road. Shalashnaya is the nearest rural locality.

References 

Rural localities in Dobryansky District